Darshana Das (born 31 March) is an Indian television actress who works in Malayalam-language soap operas.

Career
Darshana made her mini-screen debut through Pattu Saree as a soft-spoken village belle. Her first negative character was Priyanka of 2015 television series 4 the people. She rose into fame playing a negative shaded lead role Gayathri in Karuthamuthu. She played the lead role in Sumangali Bhava but later quit the show. Later she appeared as the main antagonist Sarayu in Mounaragam but had to leave the show due to pregnancy.

Filmography

Films

Serials
All serials are in Malayalam, unless otherwise noted.

Television Shows

Personal life
Darshana was born in Palakkad, Kerala. She is graduated in English literature. She has described herself as a reserved person. She married boyfriend Anoop Krishnan in 2020, the assistant director of Sumangali Bhava in which is played the female lead. The couple reside in Thodupuzha. The couple have a son born on 2021 named Arjun.

References

External links

Actresses in Malayalam television
Actresses in Tamil television
Actresses in Malayalam cinema
1992 births
Living people
Actresses from Palakkad